Sir Francis Graham Moon, 1st Baronet (28 October 1796 – 13 October 1871)  was an English printseller and publisher and served as Lord Mayor of London.

Life
Moon was born at St Andrew, Holborn, the son of Christopher Moon, and Ann, daughter of T. Withry. His father was a gold and silver smith.

Moon became a print seller and acquired a number of shops at the corner of Finch Street and Threadneedle Street in the 1820s on the site of the Royal Exchange buildings. He was considered to be the leading print publisher in London  and was commissioned by artists including David Wilkie and David Roberts.

In 1831, Moon entered the Common Council of the City of London for Bread Street ward and became one of the Sheriffs of the City of London in 1843. 
He was an alderman for Portsoken from 1844 to 1871 and for Bridge Street Without from 1871.  
In 1854, he became Lord Mayor of London and showed European leanings as in 1855 he received the French Emperor and his wife Empress Eugenie in the Guildhall. 
He was subsequently honoured as a Chevalier de la Légion d'honneur. 
He was created baronet on 4 May 1855. 
Moon was master of the Stationers' Company from 1854 to 1855 and Master of the Loriners' Company from 1855 to 1856.

Moon died at Western House, Brighton on 13 October 1871, at the age of 74. 
He was buried in the churchyard of St. Mary's Church, Fetcham, Surrey where his son Edward was rector.

Family
Moon married Anne Chancellor on 28 October 1818, and had four sons and four daughters.
His son Edward Graham Moon was a rower and clergyman and succeeded to the baronetcy. 

Through his marriage to Anne, Moon was related to the architects Frederic Chancellor and F. G. M. Chancellor.

Notes

References

External links

National Portrait Gallery

1796 births
1871 deaths
Sheriffs of the City of London
19th-century lord mayors of London
19th-century English politicians
Baronets in the Baronetage of the United Kingdom
Chevaliers of the Légion d'honneur